Elections for the London Borough of Merton were held on 4 May 1978 to elect members of Merton London Borough Council in London, England. This was on the same day as other local elections in England and Scotland.

The whole council was up for election and the incumbent majority Conservative administration maintained its overall control of the council. This was the first election held in which no aldermen were elected onto the council. Boundary changes also meant that the number of elected seats increased by 3.

Background

At the last election, the Conservatives had won a majority of three seats on the council, with twenty-nine elected members and four aldermen. They subsequently gained a seat from the Labour Party in a by-election in the ward of Wimbledon South on 19 September 1974 and then lost a seat to the Liberal Party in the ward of Cannon Hill on 30 October 1975.

Prior to the election, elected councillors appointed nine aldermen to serve on Merton London Borough Council. This was the first election in which this arrangement ended, as was required by the Local Government Act 1972, which rendered the post merely an honorary title.

The Conservatives did not stand in the newly-created ward of Longthornton, leaving the three-member ward as a two-way contest between the Labour Party and the Longthornton and Tamworth Residents Association.

Results
The Conservatives maintained their overall majority control of the council, increasing their majority to 21 seats.

Notes and references
Notes

References

1978
1978 London Borough council elections
May 1978 events in the United Kingdom